Typhoon Winnie, known in the Philippines as Typhoon Ibiang, was the worst tropical cyclone to impact the Chinese provinces of Zhejiang, Fujian, Jiangsu, and Shandong in 200 years. Originating from an area of low pressure over the Pacific Ocean on August 5, 1997, the system organized into a tropical depression. It headed northwestward, slowly strengthening into a tropical storm on August 9. Intensification became more rapid as conditions became more favorable, and Winnie reached typhoon strength on August 10. On August 12, 1997, Winnie attained Super Typhoon status, with peak 1-minute sustained winds of 160 mph. Winnie then weakened and passed north of Taiwan, before making landfall in Eastern China at Category 1-equivalent typhoon strength on the August 18. Winnie continued northeast over land while weakening, bringing heavy rainfall before dissipating on August 23.

Winnie is also tied with Typhoon Carmen in 1960 for having the largest eye on record, at 230 mi (370 km) in diameter.

Meteorological history 

On August 5, an area of low pressure formed near the Marshall Islands. The low headed northwestward while gradually organizing, strengthening into a tropical depression on the next day, with the JTWC assigning the storm the identifier 14W. Tropical Depression 14W subsequently strengthened into Tropical Storm Winnie on August 9. Intensification became more rapid as conditions became more favorable, and Winnie reached typhoon strength on August 10. Two days later, Winnie became the 4th Super Typhoon of the season, with peak 1-minute sustained winds of 160 mph. Soon afterward, the eye became ragged and large, with an outer eyewall reaching 230 miles (320 km) in diameter. On August 18, Typhoon Winnie passed north of Taiwan and made landfall in eastern China, where it winded down until it degenerated into a remnant low on August 20. Winnie's remnant continued northeastward, bringing heavy rain and damage across China, before dissipating on August 23.

Impact

Philippines
In combination with the seasonal monsoon, rainfall from Typhoon Winnie killed at least 17 people in the northern Philippines on August 18. A total of 810,105 people were affected by the storm in the country, of which 53,654 were evacuated. A total of 204 homes were destroyed and 5,885 others were damaged. Preliminary damage was estimated at 60.188 million pesos (US$2.2 million).

Japan

Taiwan
At least 46 people were killed by the storm throughout the island, 28 of whom were crushed when the  apartment building buckled and collapsed after the hillside it was on gave way near the town of Xizhi. Nine other people were trapped underneath the rubble and likely perished. Near Taipei, six people were killed in a landslide, including two children. Three more drowned amidst flood waters near the city; another died after being blown off a roof while trying to break into a home; and a sixth died from unknown causes. Flooding in suburban Taipei left the entire ground level of buildings underwater, sending debris across streets turned into rivers. Large swells produced by the storm also eroded coastal highways along the eastern shores. Additionally, an estimated 68,000 people lost power in northern Taiwan. Overall, damage from Winnie was estimated at $10 million across the island.

People's Republic of China
In the People's Republic of China, Typhoon Winnie was regarded as one of the worst storms to strike the country in over a decade. At least 310 people were confirmed to have been killed and damage exceeded $3.2 billion (1997 USD). Additionally, over 3,000 people were injured by the typhoon.

Prior to the typhoon's arrival in mainland China, officials evacuated an estimated 1 million people from coastal areas. Along coastal Zhejiang, large swells produced by Winnie breached dikes at several towns, prompting the evacuation of 30,000 people. Across the province, heavy rains flooded at least 20,000 homes and killed at least 241 people. Thousands of homes were destroyed by the storm, which accounted for a majority of the fatalities. An estimated 1.45 million people were isolated during the storm after thousands of towns were surrounded by flood waters. In Zhenjiang province alone, damage was estimated at 8.3 billion yuan (US$1 billion). Additionally, roughly 1.6 million acres of farmland was damaged, leaving $2.2 billion in losses. In nearby Jiangsu and Anhui provinces, 69 people were killed by the storm.

Aftermath

Taiwan and the Philippines
In the wake of the typhoon, rescue crews were deployed throughout Taiwan, especially to the hard-hit areas around Taipei. At the site of the apartment collapse, rescue attempts were taken out for three days and after finding no additional survivors on the third, the remaining nine trapped within the rubble were presumed dead.

In response to the widespread damage and flooding in the Philippines, the National Disaster Coordinating Council deployed disaster teams on August 20 to the affected regions to evacuate residents and begin relief efforts. The Philippine National Red Cross reported that it had enough food in store to serve 4,106 families in the wake of the storm.

People's Republic of China
According to news reports in China, emergency crews were out and repairing dikes damaged or destroyed by the typhoon as early as August 20. Within a few days of the storm's passage, food supplies and transportation had returned to normal in most of the affected areas. Roughly  of failed dikes in Zhenjiang were considered to be the main reason why the storm was unusually deadly and destructive. By August 23, residents began repairing their homes in parts of the province after having evacuated ahead of the storm.

Records
This gigantic eye contributed to Winnie's unusually large storm surge in Shanghai, even though the storm made landfall well to the south of the city.

See also

List of tropical cyclone records
Other storms with the same name
Typhoon Andy (1982)
Typhoon Soudelor

References

External links
JMA General Information of Typhoon Winnie (9713) from Digital Typhoon
JMA Best Track Data (Graphics) of Typhoon Winnie (9713)
JMA Best Track Data (Text)
JTWC Best Track Data of Super Typhoon 14W (Winnie)
14W.WINNIE from the U.S. Naval Research Laboratory

1997 disasters in China
1997 natural disasters
1997 Pacific typhoon season
Winnie
Winnie
August 1997 events in Asia